Agapius of Spain was a Christian martyr and most likely a bishop who died under the persecutions of the emperor Valerian in AD 259. According to tradition he was a Spaniard, who along with some others was exiled by the Roman government to Africa. He was martyred along with several others at Cirta in 259.

His feast day is observed on April 29.

References
St. Agapius: Catholic Online, Saints and Angels
Saint of the Day, April 29: Agapius and Companions at SaintPatrickDC.org

259 deaths
3rd-century Christian martyrs
Year of birth unknown